BGK may refer to:

Businesses and organizations
Bank Gospodarstwa Krajowego, a Polish bank

Music
Beyoncé Giselle Knowles, an American singer

Science
 Bernstein–Greene–Kruskal modes, a type of nonlinear electrostatic wave that propagates in a collisionless plasma
 Bhatnagar–Gross–Krook operator, a collision operator used in Lattice Boltzmann methods
 BgK, a neurotoxin found within the mucous secretions of sea anemones

Sports
 Barangay Ginebra Kings, a professional Philippine basketball team